The Kiss of Deception is a 2014 young adult fantasy novel written by Mary E. Pearson. The story is about princess Lia, who seeks a life outside that of royalty. This is the first novel of The Remnant Chronicles.

Plot 
In a traditional society, Princess Lia's life follows a preordained course. As First Daughter, she is expected to have the revered gift of sight - but she doesn't - and she knows her parents are perpetrating a sham when they arrange her marriage to secure an alliance with a neighboring kingdom - to a prince she has never met.

On the morning of her wedding, Lia flees to a distant village. She settles into a new life, hopeful when two strangers arrive.  She is unaware that one is the jilted prince and the other an assassin sent to kill her.

References

2014 American novels
Young adult fantasy novels
American fantasy novels
American young adult novels
Henry Holt and Company books